Pocinho Dam is a concrete gravity dam on the Douro, where the river forms the border line between the districts of Guarda and Bragança. It is located in the municipality Vila Nova de Foz Côa, in Guarda District, Portugal.

Construction of the dam began in 1974. The dam was completed in 1982. It is owned by Companhia Portuguesa de Produção de Electricidade (CPPE).

Dam
Pocinho Dam is a 49 m tall (height above foundation) and 430 m long gravity dam with a crest altitude of 139 m. The volume of the dam is 120,000 m³. The spillway with 4 radial gates is part of the dam body (maximum discharge 15,000 m³/s).

Reservoir
At full reservoir level of 125.5 m (maximum flood level of 134.5 m) the reservoir of the dam has a surface area of 8.29 km² and a total capacity of 83.07 mio. m³. The active capacity is 12.24 (12) mio. m³.

Power plant 
The run-of-the-river hydroelectric power plant was commissioned in 1983 (1982). It is operated by EDP. The plant has a nameplate capacity of 186 MW. Its average annual generation is 408.4 (406.2, 530 or 534) GWh.

The power station contains 3 Kaplan turbine-generators with 57.6 MW (62 MVA) each in a dam powerhouse located on the left side of the dam. The turbine rotation is 88.2 rpm. The minimum hydraulic head is 15.5 m, the maximum 21.6 m. Maximum flow per turbine is 390 m³/s.

The turbines were provided by Kværner, the generators by ABB Group.

Lock
On the right side of the dam is a lock, which can handle ships with the following maximum properties: 83 m in length, 11.40 m on the beam, 3.8 m load-draught and a cargo capacity of 2500 tons.

See also

 List of power stations in Portugal
 List of dams and reservoirs in Portugal

References

Dams in Portugal
Hydroelectric power stations in Portugal
Gravity dams
Dams completed in 1982
Energy infrastructure completed in 1982
1982 establishments in Portugal
Buildings and structures in Guarda District
Dams on the Douro River
Locks of Portugal
Run-of-the-river power stations